The Portuguese Chess Championship is a yearly national chess championship of Portugal. It was established in 1911, but only from the 1950s it was played yearly, with a few exceptions.

{| class="sortable wikitable"
! Nr !! Year !! Location!! Champion !! Location!! Women's Ch.
|-
| 1||1911||||António Maria Pires
|-
| 2||1926||||Mário Machado
|-
| 3||1940||||João Moura
|-
| 4||1942||||Carlos Pires
|-
| 5||1944||||Carlos Pires
|-
| 6||1946||||Mário Machado
|-
| 7||1947||||Leonel Pias
|-
| 8||1948||||Mário Machado
|-
| 9||1951||||João Moura
|-
| 10||1952||||João Moura
|-
| 11||1953||||Daniel De Oliveira
|-
| 12||1954||||João Mário Ribeiro
|-
| 13||1955||||Joaquim Durão
|-
| 14||1956||||Joaquim Durão
|-
| 15||1958||||Joaquim Durão
|-
| 16||1959||||Joaquim Durão
|-
| 17||1960||||Joaquim Durão
|-
| 18||1961||||Joaquim Durão
|-
| 19||1962||||Joaquim Durão
|-
| 20||1963||||João Mário Ribeiro
|-
| 21||1964||||Joaquim Durão
|-
| 22||1965||||Joaquim Durão
|-
| 23||1966||||João Maria Cordovil
|-
| 24||1967||||João Maria Cordovil
|-
| 25||1968||||Joaquim Durão
|-
| 26||1969||||João Maria Cordovil
|-
| 27||1970||||Joaquim Durão
|-
| 28||1971||||João Mário Ribeiro
|-
| 29||1972||||Joaquim Durão
|-
| 30||1973||||Joaquim Durão
|-
| 31||1975||||Fernando Silva
|-
| 32||1976||||Fernando Silva
|-
| 33||1977||||Fernando Silva
|-
| 34||1978||||Luís Santos
|-
| 35||1979||||Luís Santos
|-
| 36||1980||||António Fernandes
|-
| 37||1981||||Fernando Silva
|-
| 38||1982||Mangualde||Luís Santos
|-
| 39||1983||||António Fernandes
|-
| 40||1984||Lisbon||António Fernandes
|-
| 41||1985||||António Fernandes
|-
| 42||1986||||Rui Dâmaso
|-
| 43||1987||||Fernando Silva
|-
| 44||1988||||António Antunes
|-
| 45||1989||||António Fernandes
|-
| 46||1990||||António Fernandes
|-
| 47||1991||||António Fernandes
|-
| 48||1992||Lisbon||António Fernandes
|-
| 49||1993||||IM Rui Dâmaso
|-
| 50||1994||||Luís Galego||Marinha Grande||Tania Saraiva
|-
| 51||1995||||IM Rui Dâmaso||Faro||Aida Ferreira
|-
| 52||1996||||António Fernandes||Matosinhos||Alda Carvalho
|-
| 53||1997||||Fernando Silva||||Tânia Saraiva
|-
| 54||1998||||Carlos Pereira dos Santos|||| Alda Carvalho
|-
| 55||1999||||IM Rui Dâmaso||||Catarina Leite
|-
| 56||2000||||Carlos Pereira dos Santos||||Catarina Leite
|-
| 57||2001||||António Fernandes||||Catarina Leite
|-
| 58||2002||||Luís Galego||||Catarina Leite
|-
| 59||2003||||Diogo Fernando||||Catarina Leite

|-
| 60||2004||||Luís Galego||||Catarina Leite

|-
| 61||2005||Vila Real||Luís Galego||||Catarina Leite

|-
| 62||2006||||GM António Fernandes||||Catarina Leite

|-
| 63||2007||||IM Rui Dâmaso||Beja||Margarida Coimbra

|-
| 64||2008||Amadora||GM António Fernandes||||WFM Ana Baptista

|-
| 64||2009||Amadora||IM Rúben Pereira||||Ana Baptista
|-
| 64||2010||Amadora||FM Paulo Dias||Espinho||Ana Ferreira
|-
| 65||2011||Amadora||IM Paulo Dias||Vila Nova de Foz Coa||Margarida Coimbra

|-
| 66||2012||Pampilhosa da Serra||GM Luís Galego||Lisbon||Catarina Leite

|-
| 67||2013||Lisbon||IM Rui Dâmaso||Aveiro||Maria Inês Oliveira

|-
| 68||2014||Lisbon||GM António Fernandes||Lisbon||Maria Inês Oliveira

|-
| 69||2015||Lisbon||GM António Fernandes||Pedras Salgadas||Ana Inês Silva

|-
| 70||2016||Barcelos||GM António Fernandes||Matosinhos||WFM Ana Baptista

|-
| 71||2017||Gaia||IM André Ventura Sousa||Gaia||WFM Ana Baptista
|-
| 72||2018||Braga||GM António Fernandes||Braga||WFM Ariana Pintor
|-
| 73||2019||Portimão||IM André Ventura Sousa||Portimão||WCM Mariana Silva
|-
| 74||2020||Odivelas||IM André Ventura Sousa||Odivelas||Sara Soares
|-
| 75||2021||Évora||IM André Ventura Sousa||Évora||Filipa Pipiras
|-
| 76||2021||Leiria||IM André Ventura Sousa||Leiria||WCM Mariana Silva

|}

The 2011 championship was decided in a match between IM Paulo Dias and FM José Padeiro, held 21–24 October 2011 in Coimbra.

The 2013 championship was decided in a match between IM Sérgio Rocha and IM Rui Dâmaso held 2-4 October 2013 in Barreiro.

References
 Complete list of winners: Historial dos Vencedores dos Campeonatos Nacionais Individuais de Xadrez
 Details of the 1999 edition: TWIC
 Details of the 2000 edition: TWIC
 Details of the 2007 edition: chess-results.com
 Bio on Catarina Leite: 

Chess national championships
Women's chess national championships
Championship
1911 in chess